Horní Krupá is a municipality and village in Havlíčkův Brod District in the Vysočina Region of the Czech Republic. It has about 600 inhabitants.

Administrative parts
Villages of Lysá, Údolí and Zálesí are administrative parts of Horní Krupá.

References

Villages in Havlíčkův Brod District